The Yakutian knife (Sakha:  Sakha byhagha;),  sometimes called the Yakut knife, is a traditional knife of Yakuts (an ethnic group from the Sakha Republic (or Yakutia), region of Siberia), used for working with wood, hides, skins, fish and meat or for combat. The knife has been used in Yakutia for hundreds of years without significant changes in its design.
 
An unusual feature of this knife is that the blade is asymmetrical; one side of the blade has a fuller, that is a groove in it and a chisel grind, while the other side has no groove and is basically a convex edge (meaning it rounds down to the edge, rather than having a straight bevel).
The blade is traditionally forged from locally sourced iron ore smelted by Yakutian blacksmiths. The groove in the blade makes it lighter and allows the blacksmith to reduce the amount of metal needed to make larger knives.  The knife handle is historically made from birch burl and is thick and egg-shaped in cross-section. It fits the hand and can also be used wearing gloves. The birch also protects the hand from the cold effects of the knife steel in extreme cold, a common condition in Siberia during winter months. A cow tail knife sheath completes the ensemble.

See also 
Puukko, a Finnish knife
Mora knife, a Swedish knife
Sami knife
 Stroganina, a Siberian dish

References

Knives
Blade weapons
Yakut culture
Weapons of Russia